Shakeel Khan may refer to:

 Shakeel Khan (cricketer), (born 1968), Pakistani cricketer
 Shakeel Khan (umpire) (born 1952), Pakistani cricketer and umpire
 Shakeel Ahmad Khan (born 1965), Indian politician
 Shakeel Bashir Khan, Pakistani politician
 Shakeel Hussain Khan (born 1977), Pakistani actor